Sport Club Municipal Dunărea Giurgiu, commonly known as SCM Dunărea Giurgiu or Dunărea Giurgiu, is a Romanian professional football club based in the city of Giurgiu, Giurgiu County and currently playing in the Liga IV – Giurgiu County, the fourth tier of the Romanian football league system.  

The team was founded in 1948 and until the summer of 2010 it was known as FC Dunărea Giurgiu. Then it was renamed Astra II after it was bought by Ioan Niculae, owner of Liga I squad FC Astra Giurgiu. In the summer of 2012 the club was dissolved after its owner decided to cut back on expenses. Then the club was refounded in the summer of 2013 as CSM Dunărea Giurgiu.

History
Founded in 1948, after a merge between Dragaje and Acvila, two small clubs from Giurgiu, Dunărea played for several years in the districts and regional championships.

In the 1960–61 season, led by Lucian Mititelu, Dunărea won the Bucharest Regional Championship and qualified for promotion play-offs in the Second Division, but lost the promotion finishing in the 3rd place behind CFR Arad and Carpați Sinaia in a series in who also played Flacăra Roșie București, Muscelul IMS Câmpulung and Dinamo Craiova. Also, Dunărea reached the first round proper of the Romanian Cup, but lost in front of Progresul București 0–4. The squad of Dunărea during the championship and the play-offs matches was composed of: Cristache Manole, Vasile Gheorghiu, Sandu Drăgănescu, Nicolae Nemțescu, Pepi Iorgulescu, Alexandru Ghiță, Alexandru Pană, Alexandru Albu, Alexandru Iorgulescu, Ion IIiuță, Stan Ștefan (Fane Brînză), Nicu Marinel, Puiu Rotărescu, Constantin „Bebe” Năsturescu, Dumitru Nania, Vasile Ene, Negrilă și Gheorghe Grozea.  

In the summer of 1961 the club merged with Olimpia Giurgiu and played for four seasons under the name of Victoria Giurgiu. In 1965 the two clubs splitted and the white-blue team was renamed again as Dunărea and played in the refounded Divizia C. 

After five consecutive seasons in the third tier in which, usually, was a regular top-half table finisher, Dunărea managed the promotion for the first time in Divizia B at the end of the 1967–68 season winning the South Series after a strong battle with Progresul Brăila. Led by Gheorghe „Gogu" Gîrlea almost the whole season and at the end by Nicolae Nemțescu the squad of Dunărea was composed of: Gică Penescu, Ion Piticu, Ghibănescu, Iacob, Petrișor Lungu, Gore Cristache, Alexandru Ghiță, Sandu Cojocaru, State, Dumitru Ion, Liviu Borțea, Grădinaru, Dumitru Nania, Vasile Mustață, Trăistaru, Anghel, Tudor Constantin, Ilie Emil, Crăciun Clepcea, Constantin Sandu, Budurincă, Marin Stelian, Mănăilă, Pavel Nicolae and Țigănilă.

Honours
Liga III
Winners (3): 1967–68, 1974–75, 2004–05
Runners-up (2): 2002–03, 2003–04

Liga IV – Giurgiu County
Winners (3): 1992–93, 1993–94, 2016–17
Runners-up (1): 2021–22

Club Officials

Board of directors

Current technical staff

Notable Managers
  Marin Barbu
  Imilian Șerbănică

References

External links
 

Football clubs in Giurgiu County
Sport in Giurgiu
Association football clubs established in 1963
Liga II clubs
Liga III clubs
Liga IV clubs
1963 establishments in Romania